Mark Ideson (born April 10, 1976, in Parry Sound, Ontario) is a Canadian wheelchair curler who competed in the 2014 Winter Paralympic Games in Sochi and won gold. He is married and has two children. He now resides in London, Ontario. In 2007, the helicopter he was piloting crashed into a field near Cambridge, Ontario and he now lives with quadriplegia.
He played hockey and golf before he was disabled.

Personal

Ideson is married and has two children, a 17-year-old daughter, Brooklyn, and a 13-year-old son, Myles. He went to the University of Western Ontario. He studied environmental Science there, where he met his future wife, Lara. He was also a former Mustangs Cheerleader. After graduating university, he became a helicopter pilot and was introduced to wheelchair curling in 2010 at the age of 33.

Accident

In 2007, during a maintenance flight, his helicopter crashed into a field near Cambridge, Ontario. He broke 29 bones during the process. 500 metres away, Daniel Hermann, an eight-year-old boy saw this and went to his mother to call 9-1-1. The ambulance arrived shortly after within 20 minutes.  Ideson said "I had rehearsed for seven years what I was going to say to a kid that essentially saved my life. I could never really put it to words."

References

External links

1976 births
Living people
Sportspeople from Parry Sound, Ontario
Canadian male curlers
Canadian wheelchair curlers
Paralympic wheelchair curlers of Canada
Paralympic medalists in wheelchair curling
Paralympic gold medalists for Canada
Paralympic bronze medalists for Canada
Wheelchair curlers at the 2014 Winter Paralympics
Wheelchair curlers at the 2018 Winter Paralympics
Wheelchair curlers at the 2022 Winter Paralympics
Medalists at the 2014 Winter Paralympics
Medalists at the 2018 Winter Paralympics
Medalists at the 2022 Winter Paralympics
World wheelchair curling champions